2018 AC Nagano Parceiro season.

Competitions

J. League

Emperor's Cup
Beat Niigata University of Health and Welfare in the first round.	
Lost to Omiya Ardija in the 2nd round.

League table

J3 League

References

External links
 J.League official site

AC Nagano Parceiro
AC Nagano Parceiro seasons